Gina "Boom Boom" Guidi (born May 19, 1962) is a California native and resident of San Francisco, California, a professional female boxer, and a three-time champion of the world.

Guidi began boxing with her brothers at the local police athletic league as a teen, and has been boxing for more than 25 years. With an undefeated amateur record of 12-0 with nine knock outs (KOs), she went professional in 1994. 
 
Guidi regularly donates time and money to non-profit organizations, including domestic abuse prevention and AIDS research programs.

Guidi is lesbian and has publicly supported various gay causes, The Advocate (LGBT magazine) noted her as "one of the few visible out lesbian boxers" in 2003.

Her professional record is 16-1-1 with six of her wins being by KO. Her only loss was to Mary Ann Almager.

Professional boxing record

References

External links
 

1962 births
Lesbian sportswomen
Living people
American women boxers
American people of Italian descent
World boxing champions
People from San Leandro, California
Boxers from California
LGBT boxers
American LGBT sportspeople
LGBT people from California
Super-bantamweight boxers
21st-century American women